Reymarvi Rojas Velazco, better known as Beba Rojas (born September 25, 1975) is a Venezuelan actress, model and comedian.

She began her artistic career in the Venezuelan television channel Venevisión after completing her studies at the Universidad Central de Venezuela. She made her debut as a comedian in the humorous television show Bienvenidos. She later became an actress in various telenovelas on the same channel.

Beba is married and has a son named Fabio Alejandro.

Filmography

Telenovelas
 Como tú, ninguna (1994)  Thais
 Pecado de Amor (1995)  Mariela
 Sol de Tentación (1996)  Noche
 Guerra de mujeres (2001-2002)  Graciela Gamboa
 Las González (2002)  Azalea
 Cosita Rica (2003)  Panchita
 El amor las vuelve locas (2005)  Lily Fajardo
 La viuda joven (2011)  Vicenta Palacios de Humboldt
 Natalia del Mar (2002)  Ella Misma
 Válgame Dios as (2012)  La peor es nada
 De todas maneras Rosa (2013)  Ada Luz Campanero 
 Piel salvaje (2016) La Chila Pérez

Films
 El Caracazo (2005)
 Al fin y al cabo (2008)

Programs
 Bienvenidos
 Bailando con las estrellas
 Cásate y veras

References

External links

1975 births
Venezuelan film actresses
Venezuelan telenovela actresses
Living people
Venezuelan expatriates in the Dominican Republic